Adel Fattough Ali Al Gazzar (Arabic:  عادل الجزار ) is a citizen of Egypt formerly held in the United States Guantanamo Bay detainment camps, in Cuba.
The Department of Defense reports that he was born on October 22, 1965, in Cairo, Egypt.

After approximately eight years in Guantanamo, he was transferred to Slovakia in January 2010.  In June, he declared his intention to go on a hunger strike to protest conditions there.

Background

According to his lawyers Gazzar worked for the Saudi Red Crescent, and was injured during his one and only visit to Afghanistan to deliver humanitarian aid. He claimed sympathetic Pakistani dignitaries visited him in the Pakistani hospital where his wounds were treated, but that he was nevertheless falsely denounced and sold to the US for a bounty.

He was first held in a U.S prison in Kandahar where he according to lawyers "was subject to severe beatings, exposure to freezing temperatures, sleep deprivation for days on end, and suspension by the wrists."

He was injured during the American aerial bombardment of Afghanistan, and had his leg amputated above the knee by Guantanamo medical staff after i had become gangrenous from lack of care.

He stood accused of training and fighting in Kashmir.

Adel Fattough Ali Algazzar v. George W. Bush

A writ of habeas corpus, Adel Fattough Ali Algazzar v. George W. Bush, was submitted on Adel Fattough Al Algazzar's behalf.
In response
the Department of Defense published 37
pages of unclassified documents related to his Combatant Status Review Tribunal.

On October 29, 2004, Tribunal panel 15 confirmed his "enemy combatant" status.

Press reports
On July 12, 2006 the magazine Mother Jones provided excerpts from the transcripts of a selection of the Guantanamo detainees.
Al Gazzar was one of the detainees profiled.
According to the article his transcript contained the following exchange:
algazzar: I am disappointed with this tribunal because if I am in a court and you accuse me of anything I should be allowed to know what the accusations are and to see the evidence. You tell me that these accusations are unclassified but there are other classified accusations. How can I defend myself if I don’t know what the evidence is about the other accusations?...

tribunal member: If I can clarify a little bit before you start. These are all the accusations. What we will get in the classified session is in theory evidence to support these accusations, but there are no other accusations against you besides what is listed here.

algazzar: I understand that but what I mean is if you say I am an enemy combatant and you say you have evidence, I don’t get to see it. Then I will stay here….

tribunal member: Do you have any theories about why the government and the Pakistani intel folks would sell you out and turn you over to the Americans?

algazzar: Come on, man, you know what happened. In Pakistan you can buy people for $10. So what about $5,000?

tribunal member: So they sold you?

algazzar: Yes.
Canadian journalist, and former special assistant to US President George W. Bush, David Frum, published an article based on his own reading of the transcripts from the Combatant Status Review Tribunals, on November 11, 2006.
It was Frum who coined the term "Axis of evil" for use in a speech he wrote for Bush.  
Al Gazzar's transcript was one of the nine Frum briefly summarized.
His comment on Al Gazzar was:

Frum came to the conclusion that all nine of the men whose transcript he summarized had obviously lied.  
He did not, however, state how he came to the conclusion they lied.
His article concluded with the comment:

References

External links

 Moazzam Begg interviews former Guantanamo prisoner, Adel el-Gazzar, in Slovakia
 Ex-Guantánamo Prisoner Adel Al-Gazzar Returns Home to Egypt and Is Arrested June 14, 2011 
 After 8 years in Guantanamo, Egyptian jailed at Tora Prison
 Three Neglected Ex-Guantánamo Prisoners in Slovakia Embark on a Hunger Strike Andy Worthington June 27, 2010
 Guantánamo’s refugees Andy Worthington

1965 births
Living people
Egyptian extrajudicial prisoners of the United States
Egyptian Muslims
People from Cairo
Guantanamo detainees known to have been released